Tamás Faragó (born 5 August 1952) is a former Hungarian water polo player. He competed in all major international tournaments between 1970 and 1980 and won three medals at the Summer Olympics and five at the world and European championships. He was the top goalscorer at the 1976 Olympics, with 22 goals. After retiring from competitions he became a water polo coach, guiding Hungary's junior and women's national teams. In 1993 he was inducted into the International Swimming Hall of Fame, and in 2005 he was voted the Hungarian coach of the year.

See also
 Hungary men's Olympic water polo team records and statistics
 List of Olympic champions in men's water polo
 List of Olympic medalists in water polo (men)
 List of men's Olympic water polo tournament top goalscorers
 List of world champions in men's water polo
 List of world champions in women's water polo
 List of World Aquatics Championships medalists in water polo
 List of members of the International Swimming Hall of Fame

References

External links
 

1952 births
Living people
Water polo players from Budapest
Hungarian male water polo players
Olympic water polo players of Hungary
Water polo players at the 1972 Summer Olympics
Water polo players at the 1976 Summer Olympics
Water polo players at the 1980 Summer Olympics
Olympic gold medalists for Hungary
Olympic silver medalists for Hungary
Olympic bronze medalists for Hungary
Olympic medalists in water polo
Medalists at the 1972 Summer Olympics
Medalists at the 1976 Summer Olympics
Medalists at the 1980 Summer Olympics
World Aquatics Championships medalists in water polo
Hungarian water polo coaches
Hungary women's national water polo team coaches
Water polo coaches at the 2004 Summer Olympics
20th-century Hungarian people
21st-century Hungarian people